Ninnimissinuok  is an indigenous term, to refer to Native Americans of southern New England region. These people include the Pawtucket, Massachusett, Nipmuck, Pokanoket, Niantic, Mohegan and Pequot, as well as the people of western Connecticut and Long Island. This term, a variation of the Narragansett word Ninnimissinûwock, which means roughly 'people', connotes familiarity and shared identity.

The use of the term Ninnimissinuok does not imply, however, a homogeneity of social forms or motivations among the various groups so labeled. The region now known as southern New England was home to a complex variety of communities, sometimes grouped into larger polities, which can be divided into at least three basic ecological subregions: the coastal, the riverine and the uplands. Although sharing an underlying cosmology, similar languages, and a long history, the peoples living in each of these regions developed distinctive social and economic adaptations.

Although their habitations were relatively mobile, being made of striplings fixed in a circle in the ground with their tops tied by walnut bark (with hole for smoke from central fire inside), covered with mats of reed, hemp and hides, the one main migration of the entire population of each tribe (including women and children) was a biannual one and took place only from winter residence (in warmer forested areas) to summer habitation (near the cornfields) and back again. Maize and other cultivated vegetables made up a substantial part of the Ninnimissinuok diet. William Wood noted in his 1634 report that "to speake paradoxically, they be great eaters, and yet little meate-men …" Stanford nutritionist M.K. Bennett concluded that 60% of their daily caloric intake came from grain products and only 10% from animal or bird flesh (as opposed to more than 20% in the average diet in mid-20th-century America). To support their dependence on corn cultivation, the men cleared fields, broke the ground and fertilized the soil with fish and crustaceans, while the women tended to weeding with clam-shell hoes, with assiduity that amazed English settlers.

Sachems acquired their positions by selection from a hereditary group (perhaps matrilineal). The polity of the sachem was called a sontimooonk or sachemship. The members of this polity were those who pledged to defend not only the sachem himself by the institution of the sachemship itself.  Colonial writers noted that sachemships could themselves be subjected to a ruler over many sachems, a great sachem or kaeasonimoog, which the English writers referred to as "kings". Sachems held dominion over specific territories marked by geographical identifiers. The authority of the sachem was absolute within his domain. It was traditional, however, that for the sachem to strive to achieve a consensus in all important matters. One factor limiting the despotism of sachems was the option, said to have been frequently exercised, for a subject to leave a particular sachem and live under a more congenial ruler.

First encounters with Europeans 
For nearly a century before the landing of the Mayflower in 1620, the Ninnimissinuok sporadically experienced direct contact by European explorers and for decades before that the indirect consequences of European cod fishermen off the Newfoundland banks. The effect of these early encounters was profound. First, and more immediately catastrophic, Europeans brought a variety of diseases for which the aboriginal population had no resistance. When the English settlers arrived, they discovered that vast swaths of Southern New England, previously prepared for cultivation and settlement by extensive deforestation and land preparation was devoid of all inhabitants. Second, more gradual but equally profound for the economic and social conditions of the Natives, the "Fur Trade" engaged in at first by the Newfoundland fishermen, and later, more systematically by the French and English, destroyed the previously existing continental intertribal pattern of exchange in which the Natives traded local products in a system of extensive and peaceful commerce. That system was replaced by an economy driven by the demand of the Europeans for one product (animal pelts). The new economy resulted in intense intertribal rivalries and hostilities, which eventually allowed the English to play one off against the other. In addition to contributing to the first two causes of calamity, the English created immense ill-will and eventually hostilities by their aggressive approach to settlement, the brutality of which was apparent even before the first settlers. This was the result of the system the English employed which depended exclusively on private profiteers. Richard Hakluyt made plain the goals that the entrepreneurs would pursue in an "inducement" he wrote in 1585: "The ends of this voyage are these: 1, to plant the Christian religion; 2, To trafficke; 3, To conquer; Or, to do all three." The first goal was never seriously pursued.

See also 
 Native American tribes in Massachusetts

Notes

Citations

References

Primary
  (Reprint of 1674 manuscript.)
 , an annotated version of which, retaining the original orthography, is contained, together with introductory matter and notes, in 
  This work (the authors of which are not credited) is commonly called Mourt's Relation, and is generally accepted to have been written by William Bradford and Edward Winslow (as to the narrative parts) and Robert Cushman (as to the religious and promotional parts). Another annotated version is  Several different copies of that book are also hosted by HathiTrust. A version with contemporary orthography and comments was published in connection with the Plimouth Plantation, Inc. as 
 
  A digitized version with modern typeface but 1643 pagination is hosted by  the University of Michigan.
  A facsimile reproduction, with original pagination, is printed in an 1865 edition, together with a new preface and one from a 1764 reprinting, by The Society of Boston and hosted by the Internet Archive.

Secondary
 
 
 
 
 
 
 Da Capo published a facsimile reprinting of this volume in 1971.

Indigenous culture of the Northeastern Woodlands
Native American history of Massachusetts
Native American history of Connecticut
Native American history of Rhode Island
Native American history of New York (state)